The ANBO V was a parasol wing monoplane training aircraft designed for the Lithuanian Army in 1931.  A developed version, the ANBO 51 followed in 1936 and 1938.

Design

The ANBO V was of conventional configuration with fixed, tailwheel undercarriage. The pilot and instructor sat in tandem open cockpits. The prototype was powered by a Walter Vega I engine, but the small series produced had either Walter Venus or Armstrong Siddeley Genet Major engines.

In 1936, an improved version appeared, designated ANBO 51, which was Genet-powered and featured strengthened wings.

The ANBO 51 was a fabric covered aircraft with a welded steel tube fuselage structure and steel framed rudder and elevators. The parasol wings were attached to the lower fuselage with pairs of struts on each side, assisted by further centre section struts.  The wings and fixed tail surfaces were wooden structures.

Operators

Lithuanian Air Force

Specifications (ANBO 51)
Data from Jane's All the World's Aircraft 1938

References

Bibliography

 
Ramoška, Gytis, Numylėtas anbukas, Plieno Sparnai Nr. 8 2006 m., https://www.plienosparnai.lt/page.php?28

External links

 In Lithuanian

Single-engined tractor aircraft
Parasol-wing aircraft
1930s Lithuanian military trainer aircraft
5
Aircraft first flown in 1931